Seven Seals is the sixth album by the German power metal band Primal Fear, released on 15 October 2005. It is the first album with artwork which does not contain a scene depicting their bird-of-prey mascot, but instead a logo based upon it (a burning version of which is also seen on their next studio album New Religion). It is also the first album recorded in Standard D Tuning.

A music video was made for "Seven Seals".

Album concept
The album is about the battle between Heaven and Hell and how angels and demons will be affected by it. The song "Evil Spell" tries to explain that not all demons are evil creatures, but they "live under evil spells". The song "Seven Seals" is speaking of the Seven Seals broken in the Book of Revelation. The Fourth Seal is The Pale Horse whose rider is named Death "and Hell followed with Him".

Track listing 
All songs written by Mat Sinner, Stefan Leibing, Tom Naumann and Ralf Scheepers, except where noted.

Personnel
 Ralf Scheepers – lead vocal
 Stefan Leibing – guitars, keyboards
 Tom Naumann – guitars
 Mat Sinner  – bass guitar, backing vocal
 Randy Black – drums

Additional Musicians
Matz Ulmer – keyboards, string arrangements

Production
Mat Sinner – producer
Charlie Bauerfeind – producer, engineering
Mike Cashin – mixing (additional)
Nikolai Wurk – engineering (additional)
Mike Fraser – mixing
Achim "Akeem" Köhler – mastering
Paul Silveira – engineering (additional)
Katja Piolka – photography, layout, design
Martin Häusler – cover art

2005 albums
Concept albums
Nuclear Blast albums